is a Japanese manga series written and illustrated by Rettō Tajima. It was serialized in Kodansha's shōnen manga magazine Bessatsu Shōnen Magazine from August 2018 to July 2020, with its chapters collected in three tankōbon volumes. A live-action film adaptation is set to premiere in June 2023.

Media

Manga
Written and illustrated by Rettō Tajima, Mizu wa Umi ni Mukatte Nagareru was serialized in Kodansha's shōnen manga magazine Bessatsu Shōnen Magazine from August 9, 2018, to July 9, 2020. Kodansha collected its chapters in three tankōbon volumes, released from May 9, 2019, to September 9, 2020.

Volume list

Live-action film
In November 2022, it was announced that the manga would receive a live-action film adaptation which is set to premiere in June 2023.

Reception
The manga ranked 18th on the 2020 "Book of the Year" list by Da Vinci magazine.  On Takarajimasha's Kono Manga ga Sugoi! ranking of top 20 manga for male readers, the series ranked fifth on the 2019 list, and fourth on the 2020 list. The manga was nominated for the 13th and 14th Manga Taishō in 2020 and 2021, respectively. It won the 24th Tezuka Osamu Cultural Prize's New Creator Prize in 2020.

References

External links
  

Kodansha manga
Shōnen manga
Winner of Tezuka Osamu Cultural Prize (New Artist Prize)